Salim Kechiouche (born 2 April 1979) is a French actor.

Early life 
He was born to Algerian parents. While 15 years old, he was first discovered by French actor director Gaël Morel. Morel gave him his first role in a feature film, À Toute Vitesse (Full Speed), released in 1996. Kechiouche has acted in most of Morel's works, including Premières Neiges in 1999, Le Clan (Three Dancing Slaves) in 2004 and Après Lui (2007). He entered acting school and graduated in 2002.

Salim Kechiouche now lives in Paris, dividing his time between cinema and the stage.

Career

Film and stage 
In addition to Morel, Kechiouche has worked with other French directors such as François Ozon, as well as with non-French directors.

In 2003, Kechiouche played the role of Karim in Gigolo, directed by German director Bastian Schweitzer, opposite Amanda Lear. Kechiouche played a self-destructive gigolo trying to get his life back on track in the jet-set world of Paris. The film was nominated for a Golden Bear Award in the Best Short Film category at the 2005 Berlin International Film Festival.

Kechiouche has acted in short and feature films, plays and TV series. His movies include Grande École (2004), playing Mécir, and Le Clan (2004), released as Three Dancing Slaves in the U.S.. On stage in Paris, he played the role of Giuseppe Pelosi, the killer and lover of Pier Paolo Pasolini in Vie et Mort de Pier Paolo Pasolini, written by Michel Azama.

Kechiouche was kick boxing champion of France in 1998 and first runner-up in Thai boxing in 1999 and in 2002. His boxing skills were used on a few occasions in some of his films where he played a boxer, such as Les Amants Criminels, Archives De Nuit, Le Clan,  Nos Retrouvailles, and when playing himself in the experimental film Cinématon.

He has appeared in full-frontal nude scenes in at least two films. In Francois Ozon's 1999 film, Les Amants Criminels, released as Criminal Lovers in the U.S. A few years later, Kechiouche had a lengthy full-frontal scene in Grande École.

Modeling 
Pierre et Gilles produced photographs and paintings related to Les Amants Criminels and for the play Vie et Mort de Pier Paolo Pasolini in 2003. Youssef Nabil and Michel Giliberti also created a dozen paintings in 2005 and 2006. Kechiouche appeared with French actress Julie-Marie Parmentier in the photo series Doppelgänger (2007) by French photographer Raphaël Neal.

Filmography

Feature film

Short film

TV series

Theatre

References

External links 
 
 salimkechiouche.com (French)

1979 births
French people of Algerian descent
21st-century French male actors
French male film actors
Living people
French male television actors
French male stage actors